RC Bârlad is a Romanian rugby union club currently playing in the Liga Națională de Rugby. It was founded in 1958 and won the Romanian Cup in 1986 and 1987.

Current squad
In the 2022 edition of the Liga Națională de Rugby, the current squad is as follows:

References

External links
Liga Nationala de Rugby link
RC Barlad official website

Romanian rugby union teams